The 2010 Big East football season was the NCAA football season of the Big East Conference. Conference members began regular-season play on September 2, but did not begin conference play until October 8; the regular season continued through December 4. Following the regular season, six conference teams played in bowl games; although the bowl season concluded with the BCS National Championship Game on January 10, 2011, the last date on which a Big East team played was January 8, when Pittsburgh defeated Kentucky in the BBVA Compass Bowl in Birmingham, Alabama.

The conference consists of 8 football members:  Cincinnati, Connecticut, Louisville, Pittsburgh, Rutgers, South Florida, Syracuse, and West Virginia.

The Big East title race came down to the last minute of the final game of the season on December 4 between UConn and South Florida. West Virginia and Pitt had claimed shares of the conference title with wins earlier that day. A UConn win would leave the Huskies tied with WVU and Pitt for the title, but UConn would claim the automatic Big East BCS berth by virtue of victories over both schools. A field goal in the last minute gave the Huskies a 19–16 win and their first-ever trip to a BCS game.

Previous season
Cincinnati (12–1) was the Big East champions and received the conference's automatic bid into the BCS and went to the Sugar Bowl, losing to SEC runner-up Florida, 51–24.
 
Five other Big East teams went to bowl games in 2010, finishing bowl play with a record of 4–2 as a conference. Rutgers (9–4) beat Central Florida 45–24 in the St. Petersburg Bowl. Pittsburgh (10–3) defeated North Carolina 19–17 in the Meineke Car Care Bowl. West Virginia (9–4) lost to Florida State 33–21 in the Konica-Minolta Gator Bowl. South Florida (8–5) beat Northern Illinois 27–3 in the International Bowl. And, Connecticut (8–5) beat South Carolina 20–7 in the Papajohns.com Bowl. The only two teams not to go to a bowl game were Louisville (4–8) and Syracuse (4–8).

Preseason

Coaching changes
Three teams have new head coaches for the 2010 season.  Charlie Strong replaces Steve Kragthorpe at Louisville, Butch Jones replaces Brian Kelly at Cincinnati, and Skip Holtz replaces Jim Leavitt at South Florida.

Preseason poll
The 2010 Big East preseason poll was announced at the Big East Media Day in Newport, RI on August 3. Pittsburgh was chosen as the favorite to win the conference.

Big East media poll
 Pittsburgh – 190 (22)
 West Virginia – 142 (1)
 Cincinnati – 142
 Connecticut – 131 (1)
 Rutgers – 99
 South Florida – 79
 Syracuse – 41
 Louisville – 40

Award watch lists
The following Big East players listed below have been named to the preseason award watch lists.

Johnny Unitas Golden Arm Award:
 Zach Frazer, Connecticut

Lombardi Award:
 Lawrence Wilson, Connecticut
 Jason Pinkston, Pittsburgh
 Greg Romeus, Pittsburgh
 J.T. Thomas, West Virginia

Outland Trophy:
 Zach Hurd, Connecticut
 Jason Pinkston, Pittsburgh
 Art Forst, Rutgers

Rimington Trophy:
 Moe Petrus, Connecticut
 Mario Benevides, Louisville
 Ryan Bartholomew, Syracuse

Bednarik Award:
 Lawrence Wilson, Connecticut
 Greg Romeus, Pittsburgh
 Derrell Smith, Syracuse
 Robert Sands, West Virginia

Maxwell Award:
 Zach Collaros, Cincinnati
 Isaiah Pead, Cincinnati
 Jordan Todman, Connecticut
 Jon Baldwin, Pittsburgh
 Dion Lewis, Pittsburgh
 Tom Savage, Rutgers
 Noel Devine, West Virginia

Walter Camp Award:
 Dion Lewis, Pittsburgh
 Noel Devine, West Virginia

Davey O'Brien Award:
 Zach Collaros, Cincinnati
 Tom Savage, Rutgers

Biletnikoff Award:
 Armon Binns, Cincinnati
 Jon Baldwin, Pittsburgh

Butkus Award:
 Greg Lloyd, Connecticut
 Scott Lutrus, Connecticut
 Lawrence Wilson, Connecticut
 Doug Hogue, Syracuse
 Derrell Smith, Syracuse

Lou Groza Award:
 Dan Hutchins, Pittsburgh
 Tyler Bitancurt, West Virginia

John Mackey Award:
 Ben Guidulgi, Cincinnati
 Ryan Griffin, Connecticut
 Cameron Graham, Louisville
 D.C. Jefferson, Rutgers

Doak Walker Award:
 Jordan Todman, Connecticut
 Victor Anderson, Louisville
 Bilal Powell, Louisville
 Dion Lewis, Pittsburgh
 Noel Devine, West Virginia

Jim Thorpe Award:
 Johnny Patrick, Louisville
 Dom DeCicco, Pittsburgh
 Brandon Hogan, West Virginia
 Robert Sands, West Virginia

Regular season

All times Eastern time.

Rankings reflect that of the AP poll for that week until week eight when the BCS rankings will be used.

Week One

Players of the week:

Week Two

Players of the week:

Week Three

Week off:  Pittsburgh, Rutgers, South Florida

Players of the week:

Week Four

Week off: Louisville

Players of the week:

Week Five

Week off: Cincinnati, Syracuse, West Virginia

Players of the week:

Week Six

Players of the week:

Week Seven

Week off: Connecticut

Players of the week:

Week Eight

Players of the week:

Week Nine

Week off: Rutgers, South Florida

Players of the week:

Week Ten

Week off: Cincinnati, Connecticut, Pittsburgh, West Virginia

Players of the week:

Week Eleven

Players of the week:

Week Twelve

Players of the week:

Week Thirteen

Players of the week:

Week Fourteen

Last week's results set up a wild final week in the Big East, with three teams—UConn, WVU, and Pitt—still in contention for the league's BCS berth, and a possibility that as many as five teams (the three aforementioned teams plus South Florida and Syracuse) could claim a share of the conference title. The conference noted in a November 29 press release, "There could be an outright winner, three different two-way ties, a three-way tie, or even a five-way tie for the title."

Under Big East rules, the first tiebreaker is head-to-head results. In a multi-team tie, the first tiebreaker is record in games between the teams involved in the tie.

Going into the final games, the scenarios were:
 If UConn defeated South Florida, it would claim the BCS berth regardless of any other results. The Huskies held the tiebreaker in any potential two-way or three-way tie with wins over both Pitt and WVU.
 If the Huskies lost, WVU would claim the BCS berth with a win over Rutgers, as the Mountaineers held the tiebreaker over Pitt due to their win last week.
 Pitt could only claim the BCS berth with a win over Cincinnati plus losses by UConn and WVU.
 If all three teams lost, it would have created a five-way tie for the conference crown between them, USF, and Syracuse. In that event, UConn would have claimed the BCS berth as the only team with a 3–1 record in games between the five teams.

With Pitt and WVU both winning, they assured themselves a share of the Big East title. The BCS berth came down to the UConn-South Florida game, which itself went down to the final minute. Dave Teggart's 52-yard field goal, the longest of his career, with 17 seconds remaining gave the Huskies their first-ever BCS berth.

Week off: Louisville, Syracuse

Players of the week:

Rankings

Records against other conferences

Bowl games

Attendance

§Played at Paul Brown Stadium
†Played at New Meadowlands Stadium

Awards and honors

Big East Conference Awards

The following individuals received postseason honors as voted by the Big East Conference football coaches.

Todman, who became the second Connecticut running back to win the award in three years, was the unanimous choice for Offensive Player of the Year.  He was the first unanimous winner of the award since Gino Torretta in 1992.  Sheard marked the third consecutive year, and fourth time in five years, that a Pittsburgh player has won the defensive player award.

References